Everything to Me may refer to:

 "Everything to Me" (Shane Filan song)
 "Everything to Me" (Brooke Hogan song)
 "Everything to Me" (Monica song)
 "Everything to Me", a song by Avalon from Testify to Love: The Very Best of Avalon
 "Everything to Me" (Liz Phair song)
 "Everything to Me", a song by Planetshakers from Open Up the Gates
 Everything to Me, an album by Hinda Hicks
 Everything to Me, an album by Lil Rob
 Everything to Me, title of 8th episode of Big Shot (TV series) , an American television series developed by Dean Lorey and David E. Kelley